Joseph McIntosh or Joe McIntosh may refer to:

 Joseph W. McIntosh (1873–1952), United States Comptroller of the Currency, 1924–28
 Joe McIntosh (Joseph Anthony McIntosh, born 1951), former Major League Baseball pitcher
 Joseph McIntosh (Canadian politician), for Klondike (electoral district), Yukon
 Joe McIntosh (American football) (born 1962), American football running back